Jan Elizabeth Tighe (born September 16, 1962) is a retired United States Navy vice admiral who served as Deputy Chief of Naval Operations for Information Warfare and 66th Director of Naval Intelligence from July 15, 2016 to July 2018. Prior to that, Tighe served as the Commander of the Tenth Fleet and Fleet Cyber Command. She became an independent director of Goldman Sachs in December 2018.

Early life and education
Tighe was born in Bowling Green, Kentucky, and raised in Plantation, Florida. In 1984, she graduated from the United States Naval Academy and receive her commission as a cryptologist. She studied Russian at the Defense Language Institute, graduating in 2001 from the Naval Postgraduate School in Monterey, California,  with a doctorate in electrical engineering and a M.Sc degree in applied mathematics.

Naval career
Tighe's tours include Naval Security Group duty in Florida, Virginia and Japan, Fleet Air Reconnaissance Squadron 1 (VQ-1) and Naval Information Warfare Center Pacific. She was also assigned to the headquarters of the Pacific Fleet, Naval Security Group, Naval Network Warfare Command. She served as executive assistant to the Commander of the United States Cyber Command. She held command of over 2,800 multi-service and multi-agency personnel at the National Security Agency and Central Security Service of Hawaii in Kunia.

As a flag officer, Tighe served in various roles, including as commander and vice-admiral of the U.S. Fleet Cyber Command for two years, 2014—2016, and of the United States Tenth Fleet. She was a United States Cyber Command Deputy J3; N2N6 director of the Office of the Chief of Naval Operations (OPNAV); interim president of the Naval Postgraduate School; and deputy commander of the United States Fleet Cyber Command and United States Tenth Fleet.

In July 2016, Tighe became the deputy chief of Naval Information Warfare Systems Command, and the 66th director of the Office of Naval Intelligence. She retired from active duty in August 2018.

Tighe earned her Navy Information Warfare Specialist pin and Naval Aviation Observer wings, while deployed as an airborne special evaluator aboard a VQ-1 EP-3E aircraft in the Gulf War during Operation Desert Shield and Operation Desert Storm.

Awards and decorations

Tighe is a member of the Acquisition Professionals Community and holds a Level III Defense Acquisition Workforce Improvement Act (DAWIA) certification in program management.

References

|-

United States Navy vice admirals
Directors of the Office of Naval Intelligence
Living people
People from Kentucky
United States Naval Academy alumni
Female admirals of the United States Navy
1962 births
21st-century American women
Directors of Goldman Sachs